Dolapo is a given name. Notable people with the name include:

Dolapo Badmos, Nigerian police officer
Dolapo 'LowlaDee' Adeleke (born 1990), Nigerian filmmaker
Dolapo Oni, Nigerian actress and media personality
Dolapo Osinbajo (born 1967), Nigerian lawyer and political figure